Dede Feldman (born March 10, 1947 in West Chester, Pennsylvania) is a Democratic former member of the New Mexico Senate, representing the 13th District from 1997 to 2013. She did not seek reelection in 2012.

References

External links 
 Senator Dede Feldman – (D) at New Mexico Legislature
 Dede Feldman at Project Vote Smart
 Follow the Money – Dede Feldman
 2008 2006 2004 2002 2000 1996 campaign contributions

Democratic Party New Mexico state senators
1947 births
Living people
People from West Chester, Pennsylvania
Women state legislators in New Mexico
University of Pennsylvania alumni
21st-century American women